Oreolalax liangbeiensis (Liangbei toothed toad) is a species of amphibian in the family Megophryidae endemic to China: it is only known from the vicinity of its type locality, Puxiong (普雄镇) in Yuexi County, Sichuan, where it is known only from a single stream. Its natural habitats are subtropical moist montane forests and rivers. It is threatened by habitat loss.

References

liangbeiensis
Endemic fauna of Sichuan
Amphibians of China
Taxonomy articles created by Polbot
Amphibians described in 1979

Critically endangered fauna of China